The 1989–90 ECHL season was the second season of the ECHL.  The league brought back all five teams from the inaugural season and added three more franchises in Greensboro, North Carolina, Nashville, Tennessee, and Norfolk, Virginia.  Before the season began, the Carolina Thunderbirds changed their name to the Winston-Salem Thunderbirds.  The eight teams played sixty games in the schedule, unchanged from the total games played in the inaugural 1988–89 ECHL season.  The Winston-Salem Thunderbirds finished first overall in the regular season.  The Greensboro Monarchs won their first Riley Cup championship.

Regular season
Note: GP = Games played; W = Wins; L= Losses; OTL = Overtime losses; GF = Goals for; GA = Goals against; Pts = Points; Green shade = Clinched playoff spot

Riley Cup playoffs

Bracket

1st round

2nd round

Riley Cup Finals

ECHL awards

All-Star teams

First All-Star Team 
Forward: Bill McDougalli, Erie Panthers
Forward: Trent Kaese, Winston-Salem Thunderbirds
Forward: Len Soccio,  Winston-Salem Thunderbirds
Defense: Dave Doucette, Winston-Salem Thunderbirds
Defense: Bill Whitfield, Virginia Lancers
Defense: Andre Brassard, Nashville Knights
Goaltender: Alain Raymond, Hampton Roads Admirals
Head coach: Dave Allison, Virginia Lancers

Second All-Star Team 
Forward: Joe Ferras, Winston-Salem Thunderbirds
Forward: Glen Engevik, Nashville Knights
Forward: Trevor Jobe, Hampton Roads Admirals
Forward: Brian Martin, Hampton Roads Admirals
Defense: Scott Drevich, Virginia Lancers
Goaltender: Craig Barnett, Erie Panthers
Head coach: Ron Hansis, Erie Panthers

Note: The East Coast Hockey League did not hold an official All-Star game until the 1992–93 season. All-Star Teams were announced at the conclusion of the season.

See also
 ECHL
 ECHL All-Star Game
 Kelly Cup
 List of ECHL seasons

ECHL seasons
ECHL season